Carminodoris is a genus of sea slugs, dorid nudibranchs, shell-less marine gastropod mollusks in the family Discodorididae.

The genus Carminodoris was originally classified by Bergh in 1891 in the subfamily Platydorididae (despite the use of suffix -idea), a subfamily of the family Dorididae. In 1934 Alice Pruvot-Fol elevated this subfamily to its new status as family latydorididae. In 2002 Valdés has given the name Discodorididae precedence over the name Platydorididae.

The Sea Slug Forum however classifies this genus in the family Dorididae.

Species 
Species in the genus Carminodoris include:

 Carminodoris boucheti Ortea, 1979
 Carminodoris cockerelli Risbec, 1930
 Carminodoris punctulifera (Bergh, 1907)
 Carminodoris spinobranchialis Ortea & Martínez, 1992

Synonyms:
 Carminodoris armata Baba, 1993 is a synonym of Hoplodoris armata.
 Carminodoris bifurcata Baba, 1993: synonym of Hoplodoris bifurcata Baba, 1993
 Carminodoris estrelyado (Gosliner & Behrens, 1998): synonym of Hoplodoris estrelyado Gosliner & Behrens, 1998
 Carminodoris flammea (Fahey & Gosliner, 2003): synonym of Hoplodoris flammea Fahey & Gosliner, 2003
 Carminodoris grandiflora (Pease, 1860): synonym of Hoplodoris grandiflora (Pease, 1860)
 Carminodoris mauritiana Bergh, 1880: synonym of Hoplodoris grandiflora (Pease, 1860).
 Carminodoris nodulosa (Angas, 1864):synonym of Hoplodoris bifurcata (Baba, 1993).

References

External links 

Discodorididae
Gastropod genera